Bartolomé Feliú y Pérez (1843 – 1918) was a Spanish politician, scientist and professor. He was a member of the Traditionalist Communion, of which he was delegate head between 1909 and 1912.

References

1843 births
1918 deaths
Carlists
Members of the Congress of Deputies (Spain)
Members of the Congress of Deputies of the Spanish Restoration
Politicians from Navarre
Leaders of political parties in Spain
Academic staff of the University of Barcelona
Academic staff of the University of Zaragoza